Marcelo Andrés Ríos Mayorga (born 26 December 1975) is a Chilean former world No. 1 tennis player. Nicknamed "El Chino" ("The Chinese") and "El zurdo de Vitacura" ("The Lefty from Vitacura"), he became the first Latin American player to reach the top position on the Association of Tennis Professionals (ATP) singles rankings in March 1998, holding the spot for six weeks. He also held the top ranking in juniors. At , Ríos  is the shortest man to hold the number 1 ranking in men's tennis.

Ríos was the first player to win all three clay-court Masters Series tournaments (Monte Carlo, Rome, and Hamburg) since the format began in 1990. He was also the third man in history (after Michael Chang and Pete Sampras) to complete the Sunshine Double (winning Indian Wells and Miami Masters in one year), which he achieved in 1998. Despite winning those five Masters titles, Ríos is also the only man in the Open Era to have been world No. 1 without ever winning a Grand Slam singles tournament. His best major result was as runner-up at the 1998 Australian Open, losing to Petr Korda in straight sets.

Ríos retired early from professional tennis in July 2004, after being overtaken by a back injury. He played his last ATP Tour level tournament while only 27 years old at the 2003 French Open.

Tennis career
Ríos turned professional in 1994 and finished 1997, 1998, and 1999 as a top-ten player. Ríos won a total of 18 top-level singles titles and one top-level doubles title during his career.

Early years
Ríos began playing tennis at the age of 11 at the Sport Francés golf club in Vitacura (Greater Santiago), adjacent to his house.

Junior career
As a junior, Ríos reached as high as No. 1 in singles and No. 141 in doubles.

Ríos reached the semifinals of the junior French Open in 1993 without dropping a set, where he was defeated by Roberto Carretero-Diaz in straight sets, and won the junior US Open in 1993 while only dropping one set during the entire tournament. He also won his first Satellite tournament in Chile.

1994: Turned Professional
This was Ríos' first year as a professional player, and he quickly began to acquire international fame after his participation at Roland Garros, where, at just 18 years of age, he faced Pete Sampras in the second round, fighting a hard battle before eventually losing 6–7, 6–7, 4–6. His left-handed ability, plus his novel long hair and backwards visor, drew the attention of the media. The same year he won his first Challenger in Dresden, Germany.

1995: Breakthrough
In May 1995, aged 19, Ríos won his first tournament title in Bologna defeating Marcelo Filippini of Uruguay 6–2, 6–4, and breaking into the world's top 50 for the first time. Then in June, he won at Amsterdam in both singles (against Jan Siemerink, 6–4, 7–5, 6–4) and doubles (with Sjeng Schalken) and won the tournament in Kuala Lumpur against Mark Philippoussis 7–6, 6–2. He also reached the final of his home country's ATP tournament in Santiago. Ríos ended the year ranked No. 25 in the world.

1996: Top 10 debut
His achievements this year included excellent performances in the Masters Series (then called Super 9) tournaments. He reached the quarterfinals in Masters Series of Stuttgart and Rome, and the semifinals in Indian Wells, Monte Carlo, and Canada. In Sankt Pölten, Austria, he won his fourth career title by defeating the Spaniard Félix Mantilla 6–1, 6–4. Ríos again reached the final in Santiago, and also reached the finals in Barcelona and Scottsdale. For much of the year Ríos would be ranked in the top 10, becoming the first Chilean in history to do so. He finished the year ranked number 11.

1997: Impending dominance
In 1997 for the first time in Ríos' career he reached the quarterfinals of a Grand Slam tournament at the Australian Open and again at the US Open. He also won his first Masters title at Monte Carlo; after a first round bye, he beat Andrea Gaudenzi, Albert Costa, Carlos Moyá, Magnus Larsson, and, in the final, Àlex Corretja, 6–4, 6–3, 6–3. Two weeks later, he lost in the final of the Rome Masters against the same Spaniard. Other successes for the year included the quarterfinals (again) in the Stuttgart Masters and the finals in Marseille, Boston, and (for the third time) in Santiago. Ríos had a very consistent 1997 season, being the only player to reach the fourth round or better on all Grand Slams. Ríos went as high as No. 6 during the year, and ended the year in the top ten for the first time, being No. 10.

1998: World No. 1 in singles, first Grand Slam final
The year 1998 brought the peak of his career, when he reached the No. 1 spot in the world. He won the tournament (the first of the year) in Auckland, New Zealand, against Richard Fromberg, then reached the final of the Australian Open, beating Grant Stafford, Thomas Enqvist, Andrew Ilie, Lionel Roux, Alberto Berasategui and Nicolas Escudé before losing to Petr Korda in a lopsided 2–6, 2–6, 2–6 that lasted 1 hour and 25 minutes. The following months brought successes such as the title of the Super 9 (the current Masters Series) at Indian Wells, where he defeated British Greg Rusedski in the final.

The consummation came in the final at Key Biscayne, Florida, under the guidance of his coach Larry Stefanki. After victories over Hendrik Dreekmann, Tommy Haas, and Goran Ivanišević, Ríos beat Thomas Enqvist in the quarterfinals and Tim Henman in the semifinals. In the final on 29 March, Ríos defeated Andre Agassi 7–5, 6–3, 6–4. In Chile, thousands of people took to the streets to celebrate the triumph of the first Chilean, Latin and indeed Spanish speaking player to reach the sport's No. 1 ranking, grabbing the position from Pete Sampras (who had maintained 102 consecutive weeks at No. 1, and five years ending the season as the leader). In the days ahead, there was a crowded reception leading Ríos to then president Eduardo Frei Ruiz-Tagle on La Moneda Palace, with around 10,000 people cheering at the palace's surroundings. Ríos' No. 1 ranking lasted four weeks; he lost it after being unable to defend the title at Monte Carlo because of an injury suffered in the Davis Cup while defeating Hernán Gumy in Buenos Aires, Argentina. In May, he reached the quarterfinals of the French Open losing to eventual champion Carlos Moyá.

In June, at Wimbledon, Ríos was upset in the first round by Francisco Clavet. However, on 10 August, Ríos regained the No. 1 spot for another two weeks. In September, he lost at third round of the US Open to Magnus Larsson. During this season, Ríos also won the Rome Masters against Albert Costa, who withdrew from the final, Sankt Pölten by defeating Vincent Spadea, the Grand Slam Cup against Andre Agassi, and Singapore by defeating Mark Woodforde. Furthermore, he reached the quarterfinals of the Stuttgart Masters and Paris Masters. In 1998, Ríos won seven titles, including three Masters Series titles, and reached the final of the Australian Open. On 27 July of that year, he reached the maximum number of points achieved throughout his career: 3719 (according to the scoring system used prior to the year 2000). He ended the year ranked No. 2 behind Pete Sampras, who topped the world rankings for a sixth consecutive year.

1999: Continued success and beginning of injuries
Ríos maintained a high level throughout 1999, although his game was interrupted by repeated injuries and surgeries. This prevented him from defending the points achieved by reaching the final of the Australian Open the previous year, so he fell several places in the rankings. He reached the final of the Monte Carlo Masters, but after trailing 4–6, 1–2, he had to retire due to a new injury, handing the tournament to Gustavo Kuerten. Ríos subsequently won the Hamburg Masters in a match that lasted more than four hours against Mariano Zabaleta; two weeks later he became champion in Sankt Pölten for the second consecutive time against the same Argentine, who, this time, had to retire during the first set at 4–4. In October, he won at Singapore and reached the final in Beijing, losing to Magnus Norman. He also reached the quarterfinals at Roland Garros and the Stuttgart Masters. Despite many injuries he suffered and surgeries he underwent, Ríos would complete his third consecutive year as a top-ten player, at world No. 9.

2000: Persistent injuries

Since 2000 until the end of Ríos' career on the main tour, he was not able to keep up his level of play to the standards he set in the 1990s, as it was marked by repeated and disabling injuries. He still won the tournament of Umag, Croatia beating the Argentine Mariano Puerta in the final. He also reached the semifinals at the Hamburg Masters losing to Marat Safin. Ríos finished the year No. 37 in the world.

2001–2002: Decline
In 2001, Ríos won the first tournament of the year in Doha. However, his performance in the following tournaments was weaker, weakened by an ankle operation, which resulted in him dropping out of the top 50 in the world for the first time since he was a teenager. In September, Ríos won another title, this time in Hong Kong, defeating Rainer Schüttler in the final. Ríos decided to return in October to play a Challenger event in Santiago in an effort to end his curse of not winning an ATP tournament in his home country. He won the title, beating Edgardo Massa in the final. He also reached a doubles final in Scottsdale. Ríos ended the year as No. 39 in the world.

In early 2002, Ríos had some good results, but a back injury prevented him from continuing the season successfully. It was the same injury that he had already had two operations on, and finally prevented him from returning to a competitive level. His best results were the quarterfinals at the Australian Open, the semifinals at the Miami Masters, and the final in the Stockholm tournament playing the Paradorn Srichaphan. Ríos would finish in the top 25 in the world for the first time since 1999 at No. 24, but without managing to recover from the injuries that beset him since late 1999.

2003: Long absence from tour and out of top 100
Ríos reached the final of the Viña del Mar tournament (formerly the Santiago tournament) but lost to Spaniard David Sánchez. This was the fourth final he has reached and lost in his home country but failed to win. However, representing Chile alongside Fernando González and Nicolás Massú, he won the World Team Cup in Düsseldorf. In the same year, he also won silver medals in singles and doubles with Adrián García in the 2003 Pan American Games. In May, Ríos played his last ATP-level match, losing in the first round of Roland Garros to Mario Ančić and retiring at 1–6, 0–1. In 2003, Ríos played in very few tournaments, most of which he had to withdraw from due to injuries. As a result, he ended the year at No. 105 in the world, his worst year-end ranking on the main tour yet.

2004: Retirement from main tour
In 2004, six years after claiming the world No. 1 ranking, and after a long absence from the tour, Ríos returned to competition with a victory at a Challenger Series tournament in Ecuador. He played his last competitive match in early April 2004 at a Challenger in San Luis Potosí, Mexico, where he retired in the round of 16.

Finally, on 16 July 2004, after years of constant injuries—and at just 28 years old—Ríos announced his retirement from tennis during a press conference in Santiago. He organized a farewell tour across his home country, travelling through several cities, meeting with fans, offering tennis clinics, and playing friendly matches with international and local tennis players such as Petr Korda and Goran Ivanišević. The tour ended on 22 December 2004, at a soccer stadium in Santiago, where he played his final tennis match of his career on the main tour against Guillermo Coria.

2015: ITF probe request
In 2015, it was announced that the Chile Tennis Federation and Ríos himself were to request a probe by the International Tennis Federation into his 1998 Australian Open final opponent Petr Korda's possible doping activity during the tournament.

2018: Desire for a comeback
Following successful elbow surgery in November 2018, Ríos announced a comeback as part of his desire to become the oldest ever winner of a Challenger tournament, though his plans ultimately did not come to fruition.

On 21 December 2018, Ríos defeated Nicolás Lapentti 6–4, 5–7, [11–9] in an exhibition in Chile.

ATP Champions Tour

2006
On 29 March 2006, Ríos, aged 30, debuted on the ATP Champions Tour, a tour for former tour players, having met the requirement of at least two years after retirement. At his first tournament on the tour in Doha, Qatar, he defeated Thomas Muster, Henri Leconte, Pat Cash, and Cédric Pioline to claim the title. The following week he repeated, this time winning the crown in Hong Kong, where he won the final against Muster. Ríos won six tournaments in a row, adding Algarve, Graz, Paris and Eindhoven to the above. His inclusion on the senior circuit caused mild controversy, as he was significantly younger than many of his fellow competitors. He ended the year as No. 1, winning a total of six tournaments and holding a winning streak of 25 matches, achieving the record of being the only player in history to be No. 1 in the world as a junior, professional and veteran.

2007
Ríos did not take part at the Champions Tour in 2007.

He actually intended to return to the ATP Tour in February at the Viña del Mar tournament (Movistar Open), but he defaulted because of the same back injury that made him retire from the tour.

On 30 March 2007, Ríos played an exhibition match in the Movistar Arena against Andre Agassi, both as a way to commemorate the match where Ríos rose to world No. 1 and as a way of having the American play in Chile.

2008
In 2008, Ríos came back to veteran's tour where he won the tournaments in Barcelona and Algarve. On 22 June 2008, he was defeated by Pete Sampras in the final of a seniors tournament in São Paulo, Brazil. Ríos ended the year as No. 3 in the veteran's world rankings.

On 24 June 2008, Ríos defeated Sampras in an exhibition match that commemorated the 10-year anniversary of having reached the No. 1 ranking in the world.

Personal life

Ríos was born in Santiago, Chile to Jorge Ríos Jarvis, an engineer and businessman, and Alicia Mayorga, a teacher. He has an older sister, Paula.

Ríos met 14 years old Costa Rican Giuliana Sotela in September 1998 while he was training at the Nick Bollettieri Tennis Academy in Florida. Ríos and Sotela got married in December 2000 in Santiago. They have a daughter, Constanza, who was born in June 2001. In March 2004, the marriage ended in divorce, which legally took place in Costa Rica, as Chile did not allow married couples the right of divorce until November 2004. During 2004, Ríos worked as a sports commentator for a radio station in Chile.

In April 2005, Ríos married model María Eugenia "Kenita" Larraín, a former fiancée of football player Iván Zamorano. The couple subsequently experienced a very public break-up in September of the same year after an incident in Costa Rica in which Larraín was injured when Ríos allegedly threw her out of his car while he was driving to visit his daughter. Ríos claimed that marrying Larraín was "the biggest mistake of my life.". Ríos had previously been in a relationship with Larraín's cousin, Patricia Larraín, from 1995 to 1998.

In May 2008, Ríos married Paula Pavic. They have five children together, daughter Isidora (born December 2008), daughter Colomba (born June 2010), and also triplets, which are a son named Marcelo jr. and two daughters named Antonella and Agustina (all born December 2011).

In March 2008, on the tenth anniversary of Ríos reaching the No. 1 ranking, journalist Nelson Flores published a book in Spanish titled El extraño del pelo largo (The strange man with long hair), recounting his experiences following the player from his junior days up to his ascent to the top of the ATP singles ranking.

In May 2014, Ríos said in an interview with El Mercurio that he could have Asperger's syndrome. On 17 November 2016, he confirmed in an interview with Chilevisión that he was diagnosed with Asperger's twice in his life, as a child and during a Davis Cup tie, but he did not care that much until the 2014 interview.

He relocated his family to Sarasota, Florida, in late 2018, according to the website tennis-prose.com.

Controversies
Ríos' career was marked by a number of controversies.
 In 1998, he fired his coach Larry Stefanki shortly after he became world No. 1, claiming that he wanted to go in a different direction.
 After achieving number one in singles, an Argentine reporter asked him what it felt like to be at the same status as Guillermo Vilas; he answered, "I've been compared to Vilas for a while now. I do not know him. All I know is that he was No. 2, and I'm No. 1."
 He was fined US$10,000 for speeding during the 1998 Stuttgart Indoor tournament.
 In a confusing incident, he ran over his physical trainer, Manuel Astorga, in his jeep, causing serious foot injuries. Astorga was later fired as trainer.
 After a magazine published some photos of him dancing seductively with a woman at a Paris disco, his girlfriend (later to be his first wife), Giuliana Sotela, broke up with him. During a Davis Cup press conference, Ríos read a letter, asking Sotela for forgiveness. He ended the press conference in tears.
 He was accused by his second wife, María Eugenia Larraín, of throwing her out of his car while driving to visit his daughter in Costa Rica. Larraín arrived at Santiago's airport in a dramatic fashion, in a wheelchair, and showing multiple bruises on her legs. He claimed that the bruises were not caused by him but were from a skiing accident.
 He was disqualified from the 2000 Mercedes-Benz Cup tennis tournament in Los Angeles, California during a first-round match with Gouichi Motomura of Japan and fined US$5,000 for saying "fuck you" to the chair umpire.
 He was arrested in Rome in 2001 after he punched a taxi driver on the nose and then had a fight with the policemen arresting him.
 In 2003, while training for a Davis Cup tie with Ecuador, he allegedly urinated on some men in a La Serena bar's bathroom and was later expelled from his hotel after being accused of swimming nude. As a consequence, the Chilean team missed a flight to Ecuador the following day. He later apologized for the incidents.
 In 2003, he and a friend were expelled from a Santiago bar after insulting other clients and being involved in a brawl with some waiters. Both were arrested and later released.
 In 2018, Rios was fined $2,500 by the ITF after refusing to be interviewed in his then duty as an assistant to the Chilean Davis Cup team, and instead insulting journalists during a Davis Cup tie vs. Ecuador. He responded to the questions with: "As my personal friend Diego Maradona says, I never speak to reporters as you can all suck it."
In 2021, during an Instagram livestream, he accused Pamela Jiles, a Chilean deputy, of having tried to rape him as a 14-year-old, claiming that she had attempted to "take a shower" with him after an interview.

Grand Slam finals

Singles: 1 (1 runner-up)

Grand Slam Cup finals

Singles: 1 (1–0)

Masters Series finals

Singles: 7 (5–2)

Career finals

Singles: 31 (18 titles, 13 runner-ups)

Doubles: 2 (1 title, 1 runner-up)

Team competitions (1 title)

Singles performance timeline

Davis Cup matches are included in the statistics. Walkovers are neither official wins nor official losses.

1At the 1998 ATP Tour World Championships (Tennis Masters Cup), Ríos withdrew at round robin stage after playing the first match. He was replaced by then world No. 11 Greg Rusedski.

2At the 1998 Eurocard Open (Stuttgart Masters), Ríos withdrew prior to quarterfinals.

3At the 2001 Monte Carlo Masters, Ríos withdrew prior to second round.

Top 10 wins

ATP Tour career earnings

Records

 Ríos has the record for being the only player in history to have been world No. 1 as a junior, as a professional and as a senior
 He was the first Latin American to reach the world No. 1 ranking, first achieved on 30 March 1998
 He was the first player to win all three clay-court ATP Masters Series since the format started in 1990
 He is the only ATP-ranked No. 1 player not to win a Grand Slam title

Notes

References

External links

 
 
 
 

1975 births
Living people
Chilean male tennis players
Olympic tennis players of Chile
Tennis players from Santiago
People with Asperger syndrome
Tennis players at the 2000 Summer Olympics
Tennis players at the 2003 Pan American Games
US Open (tennis) junior champions
Pan American Games silver medalists for Chile
Pan American Games medalists in tennis
Grand Slam (tennis) champions in boys' singles
Masters tennis players
Medalists at the 2003 Pan American Games
ATP number 1 ranked singles tennis players